, officially translated in Japan as "Blue Sub 006", is a post-apocalyptic 3-volume manga series written and illustrated by Satoru Ozawa. The manga was published in 1967 by Shogakukan's Weekly Shōnen Sunday magazine.

When the OVA adaptation was announced by Gonzo, the manga was revised into 5 volumes under the new name AO6. It was published by Seika Bukansha and was serialized in Sebun Comics magazine in June 1997. The OVA series was released in 2000. The OVA had also received two video games for the PlayStation and Dreamcast.

Plot
The story is set in the distant future, when the Earth's oceans have risen and flooded most of the sea-lying land on Earth.

The rogue scientist Zorndyke caused the flooding, which killed countless individuals, and most of humanity's remaining cities have been attacked or destroyed by Zorndyke's army of half-animal "hybrids". The remaining humans begin to wage war against Zorndyke's seagoing creations for survival. Humanity's best hope for a resolution to the conflict lies with its submarine forces, among which is the focus of the story, Blue Submarine #6. It is revealed that Zorndyke is attempting to decisively end the conflict in the favor of his hybrid children by artificially inducing a polar switch using geothermal energy at the South Pole.

Characters
: The lead protagonist who is a pilot for underwater vessels. He is contacted by Kino to help with the Blue Fleet operation.
: A young woman around 18 years of age who enlists Hayami to help the crew of Blue 6.
: The Captain of Blue 6. While serving in the Marine Self Defense Force Submarine Division, he became an alcoholic and his wife and child left him. He became an instructor at the International Naval Academy by swearing to give up drinking. He is a veteran of Musuca battles and has experience in fighting Verg. Understanding his former student; Tetsu Hayami's great abilities and seeing the need for them, he pushed him to rejoin Blue Fleet.
: The antagonist of the story, who is supposed to be attempting to destroy humanity. He has created a series of hybrid creatures to carry out various tasks, known as the Army of Chiron. Many seem to have gone beyond his control, though they claim to be doing his will.
: The "Admiral" of Zorndyke's navy. He is very prone to fits of anger and jealousy and even savagely attacks Mutio for interacting with a human. His biggest motivation appears to be his "Papa"'s approval, and he constantly seeks it by killing humans. He foolishly believes that humans make his "Papa" sad, and not the war(s) they are involved in.
: A member of the aquatic hybrid race created by Zorndyke (often referred to as nereids). She is saved by Hayami and she later returns the favor. She becomes an outcast due to her interactions with Hayami. Even though she was banished by Verg and brutally beaten by her sisters, she still consoles him in the last episode. This forgiving nature may have developed during her interactions with Hayami and the Musuca Red Spot, or because of her natural compassion. She is the only fish-woman seen with red eyes and red spots (as opposed to the normal blue), a rare sign of genetic diversity amongst her species in the series.
:is a 10-year-old crew member who works with the sonar and communicates with Zorndyke's creatures. She is a child genius and a sonometer who uses the "Lorenzini System" included on the Blue Fleets Submarines. She is the sole member of Blue 6 who operates this system. She works in conjunction with Katsuma as guides for the crew. She was born and raised in a wealthy family. Her father is French and her mother is Vietnamese. Because she is gifted with extra sensory abilities, she was involved in a project at the Oceania Marine Development center. After the Zorndyke conflict began, Yamada saw her talent and had her join the Blue Fleet. Despite Huang's remarkable skills, she is still quite young and very emotionally frail, often time she is seen clutching her stuffed bear and is very disturbed by all the death that occurs during battle. She dislikes any kind of conflict and feels burdened by her psychic abilities.

Cast

Media

Manga
The original Blue Submarine No. 6 manga was written by Satoru Ozawa and serialized Shogakukan's Weekly Shōnen Sunday magazine from January 8 to November 5, 1967. Three tankōbon (collected chapter books) were released by Akita Shoten between March and August 1974. The manga was later revised and reworked with new cover illustrations provided by Kazutaka Miyatake to complement the OVA adaptation. The manga was released under the new subtitle AO6. This version was published by Seika Bunkansha and serialized in Sebun Kansha magazine. The manga has been collected into five volumes with new cover art and recollected within two volume Kanzenban format released October 1999. Another two-volume collection was released on June 20, 2011. 
 
Ao no Roku-gō

Ao no Roku-gō AO6

OVA
The OVA version was directed by Mahiro Maeda, written by Hiroshi Yamaguchi, and character designs provided by Range Murata and Takuhito Kusanagi. It uses a hybrid approach, combining 3D computer graphics with traditional animation (digital ink and paint), and is a pioneering example of this technique. The jazzy and atmospheric score was provided by rock n' roll big band The Thrill.

The OVA adaptation was released in the United States on April 4, 2000. Bandai Entertainment originally announced that it would air on July 8, 2000, on Cartoon Network's Toonami block, however, Toonami had made no confirmation. Bandai then confirmed that it was delayed until October due to production issues, originally planned to air from October 16 to October 19, 2000. It would finally premiere in the United States on Cartoon Network's Toonami block from November 6 to November 9, 2000.

A DVD box set was released in Japan titled . The box set contained 3 discs with the first two containing two episodes each. The third disc contains interviews from Satoru Ozawa, Mahiro Maeda along with the OVA staff, trailers and interviews for the PlayStation video game Blue Submarine No. 6: Antarctica.

The anime was initially licensed by Bandai Entertainment until their shutdown in 2012. Discotek Media has since licensed the OVA and re-released on DVD and Blu-ray on September 24, 2013. However, issues were raised when Discotek Media accidentally added in the dub of the Toonami version. Discotek stated that the dub was received from the Blue Fleet box set in which uses the dub of the Toonami version with some modifications to fit into Cartoon Network's standards and practices. Discotek continues to state that they were unaware of there being two versions and will release a single disc DVD with the original dub from Bandai Entertainment along with Japanese Audio and subtitles in 2015. They would eventually release the series on a single-disc DVD on May 31, 2016. It is a bare-bones release, however it comes with both versions of the dub, as well as DTS and Dolby Digital 5.1 audio on the Japanese track.

Music
Two soundtracks for the OVA have been released. The first soundtrack is titled  and was released on October 28, 1998. The second soundtrack is titled  and was released on April 28, 1999.

Video games
Two Japan-exclusive video games based on the Blue Submarine No. 6 OVA have been released. The first is titled, and was developed and published by Bandai Visual for the PlayStation and released on September 28, 2000. A soundtrack sharing the same name of the video game was released on July 28, 2000.

The second video game titled,  was developed and published by Sega for the Dreamcast on December 7, 2000. The English fan translation of the game was released on November 26, 2020, by Rolly & RafaMGam.

Planned live-action film
In 2005, Shōji Murahama of Gonzo stated with NewWords Magazine that a live-action Blue Submarine No. 6 film will be produced for approximately 10 billion yen (US$84 Million). Masahiko Ōkura has been confirmed to direct the movie. This is to be G.D.H.'s first live-action project with 30 more live-action projects under consideration. However, since the announcement, there has been no news nor reports of any progress.

Reception
Eric Luce of Ex criticized the second manga for its characters and pacing stating: "This manga moves so slowly, one is tempted just to skip pages at a time to find a scene where something is happening. The characters seem to exist without a past so they lack any real depth".

The Blue Submarine No. 6 OVA was ranked as the 70th best anime of all time by the Japanese magazine Animage. It was ranked 25th best anime of all time by Wizard's Anime Invasion. The Society for the Promotion of Japanese Animation awarded the it "Best OVA, U.S. Release" for 2000.

Anime News Network praised the OVA for its animation stating: "Oceanscapes are beautifully rendered, aircraft looks extremely realistic, and the underwater fighting is simply breathtaking". However criticized the characters stating: "The characters, although nicely designed, are sparsely drawn and shaded, and there is absolutely no personality to them whatsoever". Eric Luce also praised the graphics and animation stating: "The producers of this show are pushing many boundaries in composition and editing.  this show is probably one of the best uses so far of integrating the two". Bryce Coulter of Mania criticized the plot stating: " The flashy production and great musical score doesn't mean a whole lot without a decent plot. Blue Submarine No. 6 tends to ride the fence in this area". Carlos Ross of THEM Anime Reviews initially praised the series for its graphics, plot and characters. However a decade after the review and CGI and cel shading became the norm in animation, he updated his review criticizing the characters and plot. He had since referred it as a transition between classic "acetate age" and the modern computerized form of Japanese animation.

For the Blu-ray release of the OVA, Anime News Network gave a more positive review stating: "Despite some dated-looking CG, on the whole Blue Submarine No. 6 stands up surprisingly well. Its writing flaws may have become more apparent over time, but it can still be a thrilling view and its roughly 120 minute total length keeps the story so compact that viewers do not have much opportunity to get bored". Helen McCarthy in 500 Essential Anime Movies claimed that anime had "an interesting story, beautifully animated, with some jaw-droppingly good design concepts". She praised the characters design, especially Zorndyke's and stated that director Maeda "is one of the most imaginative visualists in anime".

See also
For another anime about a "blue" submarine battleship, see Space Carrier Blue Noah or Arpeggio of Blue Steel.

References

Related links
 
J-pop.com review

SEGA-SKY Dreamcast game review (Polish) and Rolly & RafaMGam English Translation Patch published

1967 manga
1998 anime OVAs
Action anime and manga
Anime series based on manga
Bandai Entertainment anime titles
Discotek Media
Dystopian anime and manga
Gonzo (company)
Post-apocalyptic anime and manga
Science fiction anime and manga
Seinen manga
Shogakukan manga
Shōnen manga
Speculative fiction anime and manga
Submarines in fiction
Toonami